Vlastimil Černý (born April 7, 1963) is a former butterfly and freestyle swimmer, who competed for Canada at the 1988 Summer Olympics in Seoul, South Korea.  There he finished in 12th position in the 100-metre butterfly, and in ninth place with the men's 4x100-metre freestyle relay team.

In 1982, he, along with Miloslav Rolko, Tereza Vrtiskova and Josef Kuf (all swimmers), defected from Czechoslovakia following a  meet in Sindelfingen, West Germany.

Černý has been the coach of the University of Manitoba Bisons Swim team since 1993.  In 2020, he was awarded the U SPORTS Fox 40 women's swimming Coach of the Year.

See also
 List of Commonwealth Games medallists in swimming (men)

References 

1963 births
Living people
People from Vyškov
Canadian male butterfly swimmers
Canadian male freestyle swimmers
Canadian people of Czech descent
Czechoslovak emigrants to Canada
Olympic swimmers of Canada
Swimmers at the 1988 Summer Olympics
Commonwealth Games medallists in swimming
Commonwealth Games silver medallists for Canada
Swimmers at the 1986 Commonwealth Games
Sportspeople from the South Moravian Region
Medallists at the 1986 Commonwealth Games